Gregory David Smith (born 14 September 1960) is a former Australian politician. He was a Liberal member of the Western Australian Legislative Council for Mining and Pastoral from 1997 to 2001.

Smith was born in Melbourne, Victoria. A shearer and pastoralist, he moved to Western Australia in 1988. He was elected to parliament in 1996 for a term commencing in 1997 and held his seat until he was defeated at the 2001 state election.

References

1960 births
Living people
Liberal Party of Australia members of the Parliament of Western Australia
Members of the Western Australian Legislative Council
21st-century Australian politicians